Jalle Jungnell (born 6 November 1954) is a Swedish Paralympic wheelchair curler. His team won bronze in Wheelchair curling at the 2006 Winter Paralympics and in the 2009 World wheelchair curling championship they won silver. He is also the founder and owner of Panthera, a  wheelchair-manufacturer in Sweden.

Results

References

External links

Profile at the Official Website for the 2010 Winter Paralympics in Vancouver

1954 births
Living people
Swedish male curlers
Swedish wheelchair curlers
Medalists at the 2006 Winter Paralympics
Medalists at the 2010 Winter Paralympics
Paralympic bronze medalists for Sweden
Paralympic wheelchair curlers of Sweden
Wheelchair curlers at the 2006 Winter Paralympics
Wheelchair curlers at the 2010 Winter Paralympics
Wheelchair curlers at the 2014 Winter Paralympics
Paralympic medalists in wheelchair curling
21st-century Swedish people